Mecodema crenaticolle is a medium-bodied ground beetle that is endemic to New Zealand. It is one of the three species within the ducale species group and is the only species of this group found in the North Island, New Zealand. Its range extends from the Wellington Region to Hunua Range, southeast Auckland, and is relatively common in most native forest habitats.

Diagnosis 
Distinguishable from other North Island Mecodema species by having:

 the pronotum carina strongly crenulated; 
 elytral striae 1–4 with large star-shaped asetose punctures in an irregular pattern, striae 5–7 with asetose punctures not star-shaped, but irregularly spaced; 
 an elytral setose puncture basad scutellum.

Description 
Length 21–27.9 mm, pronotal width 5.8–7.3 mm, elytral width 6.7–8.6 mm. Colour of entire body reddish-brown to black.

Natural history 
Flightless and nocturnal predator of ground invertebrates including spiders, other carabids and worms.

References 

crenaticolle
Beetles described in 1868
Beetles of New Zealand
Fauna of the North Island